The John Daniels House is a historic building located at 77 Yorkville Avenue in the Yorkville neighbourhood in Toronto, Ontario, Canada.

John Daniels, a constable for the village of Yorkville in the mid-19th century, built the structure as his home in 1867. It is designed in a Georgian style.

It is one of the last surviving historic buildings in the area, and was designated under the Ontario Heritage Act in 1985. Presently, it houses a small antique shop.

References

See also
List of oldest buildings and structures in Toronto

Houses in Toronto
Houses completed in 1867
Georgian architecture in Canada